This is a list of Croatian television related events from 1985.

Events

Debuts

Television shows

Ending this year

Births
13 April - Iva Mihalić, actress
20 June - Mirna Medaković, actress

Deaths